Elections for Southwark Council were held on 6 May 2010.  The 2010 General Election and other local elections took place on the same day.

In London council elections the entire council is elected every four years, opposed to some local elections where one councillor is elected every year for three of the four years. Southwark has 21 wards, each electing 3 councillors giving a total number of seats as 63.

The Labour Party gained overall control, which they had previously had until 2002, replacing the previous Lib Dem-Conservative coalition. The Labour Party increased their vote substantially, which it was suggested was caused by the high turnout. Turnout was approximately double that of the 2006 elections, due to the general election being held on the same day.

Green London Assembly member Jenny Jones lost her seat.

Summary of results

Ward results
* - Existing Councillor seeking re-election.

Brunswick Park

John Friary was a sitting councillor for Camberwell Green ward

Camberwell Green

Cathedrals

Chaucer

College

Gordon Nardell was a sitting councillor for The Lane ward

Lorraine Zuleta was a sitting councillor for Chaucer ward

East Dulwich

East Walworth

Faraday

Grange

Livesey

Newington

Nunhead

Peckham

Ola Oyewunmi was elected for Labour in 2006. The change in his vote is relative to his performance then as a Labour candidate, rather than the top Liberal Democrat candidate.

Peckham Rye

Riverside

Aubyn Graham was a sitting councillor for Peckham Rye ward

Christopher Page was a sitting councillor for Camberwell Green ward

Rotherhithe

South Bermondsey

Ade Lasaki was elected as a Liberal Democrat in 2006. The change in his vote is relative to his performance then as a Liberal Democrat, rather than the second-placed Labour candidate.

South Camberwell

Surrey Docks

Robert Smeath was a sitting councillor for Peckham Rye ward

The Lane

Village

Robin Crookshank Hilton was elected as a Conservative in 2006. The change in her vote is relative to her performance then as a Conservative, rather than the top Liberal Democrat candidate.

By-Elections 2010–2014

The by-election was called following the resignation of Cllr. John J. Friary.

The by-election was called following the resignation of Cllr. Ms. Keadean M. Rhoden.

The by-election was called following the death of Cllr. Tayo A. Situ.

The by-election was called following the death of Cllr. Ms. Helen Morrissey.

References

Council elections in the London Borough of Southwark
2010 London Borough council elections
May 2010 events in the United Kingdom
21st century in the London Borough of Southwark
2010 in London